Anthony "Tony" Mansfield (1939 – 10 March 2013) was an Irish hurler and manager who played for the Waterford senior team.

Mansfield played for Waterford during the 1960s, however, he enjoyed little success during his inter-county career. During that time he won one Munster medal as a non-playing substitute. Mansfield was an All-Ireland runner-up on one occasion, also as a non-playing substitute.

At club level Mansfield played with Abbeyside–Ballinacourty.

In retirement from playing Mansfield became involved in coaching and team management. He spent several terms as manager of the Waterford under-21 and senior teams and enjoyed some success. Mansfield also served as a referee at club level.

References

1939 births
2013 deaths
Abbeyside hurlers
Hurling managers
Hurling referees
Waterford inter-county hurlers